Laad Bazaar or Choodi Bazaar is a market located in Hyderabad, India. It is located on one of the four main roads that branch out from the Charminar.

Laad meaning lacquer, is used to make bangles, on which artificial diamonds are studded. In this -long shopping strip, most of the shops sell bangles, saris, wedding related items, and imitation jewelry.

History
This market has been in operation since the time of the Qutb Shahis and the Nizams. It is close to landmarks such as Charminar, Makkah Masjid and Chowmahalla Palace.

Shopping

Choodi Bazaar is the main market for bangles, semi-precious stones, pearls, jewelry, products such as silverware, Nirmal, Kalamkari paintings, bidriware, lacquer bangles studded with stones, saris and handwoven materials of silk, cotton, brocade, velvet and gold embroidered fabrics, traditional Khara Dupattas, lacquer bangles, and perfumes.

Towards the southeast of the bazaar lie the palaces built by different Nizams, including the Chowmahalla Palace.

Reference list

See also

External links

Picture of the bazaar
Bangles on display
Satellite picture by Google Maps

Bazaars
Bazaars in India
Bazaars in Hyderabad, India
Neighbourhoods in Hyderabad, India
Shopping districts and streets in India